The basketball tournaments of NCAA Season 90 were the Philippines' National Collegiate Athletic Association tournaments for the 90th season. The José Rizal University hosted the season, starting with an opening ceremony held on June 28, 2014 at the Mall of Asia Arena followed by a double-header. Games were held at the Filoil Flying V Arena in San Juan, with two seniors and juniors games every Mondays, Wednesdays, and Fridays and one senior and junior game every Saturday. The seniors' games were aired live by TV5 and AksyonTV.

Seniors' tournament

Teams

Elimination round

Team standings

Match-up results

Scores

First-seed playoff
Winner faces Perpetual Help, while loser faces JRU, in the semifinals. Either way, both teams had twice-to-beat advantage in the semifinals.

Third–seed playoff
Winner faces Arellano, while loser faces San Beda, in the semifinals. Either way, both teams have to win twice in the semifinals to progress.

Bracket

Semifinals
San Beda and Arellano had the twice-to-beat advantage; they only had to win once, while their opponents twice, to advance to the Finals.

San Beda vs. Perpetual

Arellano vs. JRU

Finals
The finals is a best-of-3 series.

Finals Most Valuable Player:

Awards 
Most Valuable Player: 
Rookie of the Year: 
Mythical Five:

All-Defensive Team:

Most Improved Player: 
Defensive Player of the Year:

All-Star Game
The 10 member schools were divided into East and West. The East squad is represented by players from San Beda College, University of Perpetual Help, Arellano University, Jose Rizal University and San Sebastian College-Recoletos, while the West team draws from Lyceum of the Philippines University, Emilio Aguinaldo College, College of Saint Benilde, Mapua Institute of Technology, and Colegio de San Juan de Letran.

Team East was coached by Boyet Fernandez of the Red Lions, while Caloy Garcia of the Knights calls the shots of Team West.

Juniors' tournament

Elimination round

Team standings

Match-up results

Scores

First-seed playoff

Bracket

Semifinals
Mapúa and San Beda had the twice-to-beat advantage; they only had to win once, while their opponents twice, to advance to the Finals.

Mapúa vs. JRU

San Beda vs. Letran

Finals
This finals is a best-of-3 series.

Finals Most Valuable Player:

Awards 
Most Valuable Player: 
Rookie of the Year: 
Mythical Five:

All-Defensive Team:

Most Improved Player: 
Defensive Player of the Year:

See also 
 UAAP Season 77 basketball tournaments

References

External links
Official website

90
2014–15 in Philippine college basketball